The Kandahar State Railway opened c.1881, originally ran from Sibi and then on wards to Rindli, with the intention to reaching Quetta and onwards to Kandahar. However, the line never reached Quetta. The Kandahar State Railway joined with the southern section of the Sind–Pishin State Railway and in 1886 amalgamated, with other railways, to form North Western State Railway (NWR).

History
From Sibi, the line ran south-west, skirting the hills to Rindli, and originally followed the course of the Bolan stream to its head on the plateau. The destructive action of floods, however, led to the abandonment of this alignment. The railway now follows the Mashkaf Valley. The Bolan Pass Railway construction enabled this NWR route to be selected. Today, this line lies abandoned.

Stations
 Sibi Junction
 Nari
 Babar Kachh
 Speentangi
 Harnai
 Nakus
 Sharigh
 Khost
 Zardalu

Personnel 
Henry Francis Storey: 1880, Engineer-in-Chief of the Jacobabad section. 1881, appointed Engineer-in-Chief. 1883, promoted to the Superintendent of Way and Works.
Hugh Lewin Monk: deployed from the Railway Branch of the Public Works Department to Kandahar State Railway until 1881.

See also
 History of rail transport in Pakistan
 North Western State Railway 
 Sind–Pishin State Railway
 Pakistan Railways

References 
The spelling of Scinde, Punjaub & Delhi Railway is variable. Scinde and Punjaub are the spellings adopted in the legislation - see "Government Statute Law Repeals 2012" pages 134-135, paragraphs 3.78-3.83.

External links
  Fairlawn School was established as Scind, Punjaub and Delhi Railway School, Mussoorie in 1877 
 Thacker's "1872 Scinde, Punjab and Delhi Railway Personnel"

Defunct railway companies of Pakistan
Railway companies established in 1881
Railway companies disestablished in 1885
1881 establishments in India
Railway stations on Kandahar State Railway Line
Rail transport in Balochistan, Pakistan